Fermor is a surname, a variant of Farmer. Notable people with the surname include:

 Henrietta Louisa Fermor (1698–1761), English letter writer
 Lewis Leigh Fermor (1880–1954), British geologist, father of Patrick
 Patrick Leigh Fermor (1915–2011), British author, scholar and soldier
 Richard Fermor (d. 1551), English wool merchant and landowner
 Thomas Fermor (by 1523–1580), English politician
 Thomas Fermor, 4th Earl of Pomfret (1770-1833), British army officer
 William Fermor (1702-1771), Russian army officer, commander at Zorndorf

See also

 Farmer (surname)
 Fermor-Hesketh, surname

Occupational surnames